Dzhioyev is Russian variation of an Ossetic surname that may refer to:

 Georgi Dzhioyev (born 1986), Russian footballer
 Inal Dzhioyev (born 1969), Russian footballer
 Soslan Tamerlanovich Dzhioyev (born 1989), Russian footballer
 Soslan Vyacheslavovich Dzhioyev (born 1993), Russian footballer
 Stanislav Dzhioyev (born 1989), Russian footballer

Ossetian-language surnames
Russian-language surnames